Thomas Geisel (born October 26, 1963 in Ellwangen) is a German politician of the Social Democratic Party who served as mayor of Düsseldorf, the capital of Northrhine-Westphalia, from 2014 till 2020.

Education and early career
Trained as a lawyer, Geisel worked at Enron in London from 1998 until 2000 and at Ruhrgas from 2000 until 2013.

Political career
Geisel joined the SPD as a member in 1983.

In a runoff election, Geisel defeated the previous Christian Democratic mayor Dirk Elbers by gaining 59.2% of the votes. During his time in office, Düsseldorf sold its stake in utility RWE for 155.4 million euros ($171.28 million) in 2019.

Thomas Geisel lost the office as mayor in the second round of the Düsseldorf communal election on September 27, 2020, He got 44,0 % of the votes, his opponent Stephan Keller reached 56,0 %.

Other activities

Corporate boards
 Innogy, Member of the Retail International Business Council (since 2016)
 Düsseldorf Airport, Ex-Officio Chairman of the Supervisory Board (since 2014)
 Düsseldorf Marketing & Tourismus, Ex-Officio Chairman of the Supervisory Board (since 2014)
 Industrieterrains Düsseldorf-Reisholz AG, Ex-Officio Chairman of the Supervisory Board (since 2014)
 Messe Düsseldorf, Ex-Officio Chairman of the Supervisory Board (since 2014)
 Rheinbahn, Ex-Officio Chairman of the Supervisory Board (since 2014)
 Stadtwerke Düsseldorf, Ex-Officio Member of the Supervisory Board (since 2014)
 SWD Städtische Wohnungsbau-GmbH & Co. KG, Ex-Officio Chairman of the Supervisory Board (since 2014)

Non-profit organizations
 Deutsche Oper am Rhein, Ex-Officio Chairman of the Supervisory Board (since 2014)
 Düsseldorf Festival, Ex-Officio Member of the Board of Trustees (since 2014)
 Museum Kunstpalast, Ex-Officio Chairman of the Board of Trustees (since 2014)
 ZERO Foundation, Ex-Officio Chairman of the Board of Trustees
 Atlantik-Brücke, Member
 Tönissteiner Kreis, Member
 German United Services Trade Union (ver.di), Member

Controversy
In late 2017, Geisel came under intense international criticism for canceling an exhibition about the Jewish art dealer Max Stern, who was forced to liquidate his gallery in Düsseldorf after the Nazis took power before World War II. At the time, he cited “demands for information and restitution in German museums in connection with the Galerie Max Stern.” Following protests from the Jewish community in Düsseldorf, the World Jewish Congress, the partner museums in Israel and Canada, and the German government, Geisel later backtracked on his last-minute cancellation.

Personal life
Geisel is married and has five daughters. The family lives in Düsseldorf-Pempelfort.

References

External links 
 Official Homepage
 Düsseldorfer OB Elbers abgestraft - Geisel gewinnt

1963 births
Living people
Mayors of Düsseldorf
Social Democratic Party of Germany politicians